The Neman, Niemen, Nioman, Nemunas or Memel is a river in Europe that rises in central Belarus and flows through Lithuania then forms the northern border of Kaliningrad Oblast, Russia's western exclave, which specifically follows its southern channel. It drains into the Curonian Lagoon, narrowly connected to the Baltic Sea. It flows generally west to Grodno within  of the Polish border, north to Kaunas, then westward again to the sea.

The largest river in Lithuania, and the third-largest in Belarus, it is navigable for most of its length. Only , an eastward meander, contributes to the Belarus–Lithuania border. Thereafter the river includes notable loops along a minor tectonic fault.

Its drainage basin settled in the late Quaternary to be roughly along the edge of the last glacial sheet so dates to about 25,000 to 22,000 years BC.

Numbers

It is the 4th longest river in the Baltic Sea basin. A  stretch is the border between Lithuania and Russia's Kaliningrad oblast.
Severe floods occur on the lower reaches of the river about every 12 – 15 years, which sometimes wash out bridges.

 The Nioman/Nemunas/Neman is an old river, dating back to the last glacial period.
 It has about 105 first-class tributaries, the largest being the rivers Neris (Viliya), Shchara, and Šešupė.
 In the complete Nioman/Nemunas/Neman basin, there are tributaries extending to the 11th order.
 The Nemunas basin in Lithuania drains more than 20,000 rivers and rivulets and covers 72% of Lithuania's territory.

River course

Nemunas loops

Due to their location, "The Nemunas loops" are often described using the Lithuanian name for the river. In 1992 Nemunas Loops Regional Park was founded. Its goal is to preserve the loops (Lithuanian: vingis) that the river makes in the Punia forest. Near Prienai, the Nemunas makes a  loop (like a teardrop) coming within  of completing the loop. The loops are not conventional river meanders; they follow underlying tectonic structures. The faults are the source of local mineral springs. The area is historically and culturally significant. Its castles served as the first line of defense against forays by the Teutonic knights.

Delta

At its delta the Nemunas splits into a maze of river branches and canals mixing with polders and wetlands and is a very attractive destination for eco-tourism. The four main distributaries are Atmata, Pakalnė, Skirvytė (the southern mouth, marking the international border) and Gilija. The river plays a crucial part in the ecosystem of the Curonian Lagoon. It provides the main water inflow to the lagoon and keeps the water almost fresh. This allows fresh water and brackish water animals to survive there. As the delta extends north the lagoon opposite narrows. Since the delta is in Lithuania, it is often referred to as Nemunas Delta. Nemunas Delta Regional Park was created in the delta in 1992.

Tributaries 
The following rivers are tributaries to the river Neman/Nemunas (from source to mouth):

Left: Servach, Mowchadz’, Shchara, Zelvyanka, Svislach, Lasosna, Czarna Hańcza, Zembrė, Peršėkė, Šešupė, Tylzha
Right: Western Berezina, Gauja, Kotra, Haradnichanka, Merkys, Verknė, Strėva, Neris, Nevėžis, Dubysa, Mituva, Jūra, Minija

Largest settlements on the river
From west to east, the largest settlements are Sovetsk/Tilsit, Neman, Kaunas, Alytus, Druskininkai, Grodno, and Masty.

Significance in culture
Ptolemy referred to Neman as Chronos (although competing theories suppose Chronos was in fact Pregolya).

The river has lent its name to the Neman Culture, a Neolithic archaeological subculture.

The city of Memel, now in Lithuania, is known today as Klaipėda (confusingly, another city of Memel was on the Dange River, now called the Danė). In German road maps and lexika, only the  section within Prussia (starting at Schmalleningken) was named Memel; the bulk of the river was the Niemen.

The border between the State of the Teutonic Order and Lithuania was fixed in 1422 by the Treaty of Lake Melno and remained stable for centuries. The Treaty of Tilsit between Napoleon and Tsar Alexander I was signed on a raft in the river in 1807. Napoleon's crossing at the outset of the 1812 French invasion of Russia is described in War and Peace and also mentioned in Pan Tadeusz. In 1919, the Treaty of Versailles made the river the border separating the Memel Territory from German East Prussia as of 1920. In the first stanza of the song, written in 1841, the river is mentioned as the eastern border of a (then politically yet-to-be united) Germany:

Lithuanians refer to the Nemunas as "the father of rivers" (Nemunas is a masculine noun in Lithuania). Countless companies and organizations in Lithuania have "Nemunas" in their name, including a folklore ensemble, a weekly magazine about art and culture, a sanatorium, and numerous guest houses and hotels. Lithuanian and Polish literature often mention the Nemunas. One of the most famous poems by Maironis starts:

Almost every Lithuanian can recite these words by heart.

Smaller rivers and rivulets in Lithuania with names morphologically derived or cognate are the Nemunykštis, Nemuniukas, Nemunynas, Nemunėlis and Nemunaitis. 

The etymology is disputed: some say that "Nemunas" is an old word meaning "a damp place", while others that it is "mute, soundless river" (from nemti, nėmti "to become silent", also memelis, mimelis, mėmė "slow, worthless person"). The name is possibly derived from the Finnic word niemi "cape".

Art critics praised its depiction in the paintings by Michał Kulesza.

Economic significance

Much of the river is used for fishing, hydropower generation, water supply, industry, agriculture, recreation, tourism, and water transport. 

Lithuania has tabled local plans to dredge it, below Kaunas, to make it more consistently usable.

The largest cities on the river are Grodno in Belarus, Alytus and Kaunas in Lithuania, and Sovetsk in the Kaliningrad Oblast of Russia. The river basin has a population of 5.4 million inhabitants. Industrial activities in the Belarusian section include metal processing, chemical industries, pulp and paper production, and manufacturing of building materials, as well as food-processing plants. In Lithuania, the city of Kaunas, with about 400,000 inhabitants, is the country's principal user of the river; the local industries that impact the river are hydropower generation, machinery, chemical, wood processing and paper production, furniture production, textile and food-processing. In Kaliningrad, industrial centers near the river include Sovetsk and Neman, which have large pulp and paper production facilities.

Above Kaunas a dam was built in 1959 to serve the Kaunas Hydroelectric Power Plant. The resulting Kaunas Reservoir is the largest such lake in Lithuania. The reservoir is a popular destination for Lithuanian yachting.

The Augustów Canal, built in the 19th century, connects the Neman to the Vistula River.

Biological communities
Fish found include the: perch, pike, zander, roach, tench, bream, rudd, ruffe, and bleak. 

Its tributaries have borne stone loach, three-spined stickleback, minnows, trout, sculpins, gudgeon, dace and chub.

Atlantic salmon migrated upstream to spawn; however, dams on the river, most of them built in the 20th century, have depleted them. The dam at Kaunas does not provide fish ladders. The spawning season took place in the fall. Ethnographic studies, from before the dams, state night fishing, using torches and harpoons, was a common technique.

Environmental issues

A report by the Swedish EPA (Environmental Protection Administration) rates the river's quality in Lithuania as moderately polluted to polluted. High concentrations of organic pollutants, nitrates and phosphates occur in parts of the river.  Environmental issues include water quality (eutrophication and pollutants largely due to outdated technology sewage treatment works), changes in the hydrological regime, and flooding control. The environmental problems in each of the countries that make up the basin are slightly different. In Belarus, the main problems are oil products as well as nitrogen and BOD (biological oxygen demand). The environmental issues in the Kaliningrad section include high concentrations of BOD, lignosulphates, and nitrogen. In Lithuania, the Kaunas Hydroelectric Power Plant barrage affects the riparian ecosystem.

Co-operation which would be beneficial is complicated by the geographical split between three nations but water quality improvement initiatives are underway.

See also 
 List of rivers of Europe
 Normandie-Niemen (a fighter squadron, later regiment (of three squadrons) of the French Air Force)
 Memelland
 East Prussia

Notes

References

External links 

 Niemen (the Neman) in the Geographical Dictionary of the Kingdom of Poland (1886)
 Glaciation in Lithuania
 Biotopes in the Neman and its tributaries
 Atlantic salmon in the Neman River
Agata Lewandowski, Łosośna - the Unknown Valley. Not the Last Arrival for...Puciłki, „Znad Wilii”, nr 3(79) z 2019 r., p. 58–64, (in Polish)http://www.znadwiliiwilno.lt/wp-content/uploads/2019/10/Znad-Wilii-3-79m-1.pdf
Helena i Leonard Drożdżewiczowie, Antologia Doliny Łosośny, (in Polish)http://193.0.118.54/search/query?term_1=Antologia+Doliny+%C5%81oso%C5%9Bny&theme=nukat

 
Rivers of Grodno Region
Rivers of Minsk Region
Rivers of Lithuania
Rivers of Kaliningrad Oblast
International rivers of Europe
Lithuania–Russia border
Belarus–Lithuania border
Rivers of Belarus